This list shows the IUCN Red List status of the 56 mammal species occurring in North Macedonia. Nine are vulnerable and three are near threatened.
The following tags are used to highlight each species' status as assessed on the respective IUCN Red List published by the International Union for Conservation of Nature:

Order: Rodentia (rodents) 

Rodents make up the largest order of mammals, with over 40% of mammalian species. They have two incisors in the upper and lower jaw which grow continually and must be kept short by gnawing.

Suborder: Sciurognathi
Family: Sciuridae (squirrels)
Subfamily: Sciurinae
Tribe: Sciurini
Genus: Sciurus
 Red squirrel, S. vulgaris  
Subfamily: Xerinae
Tribe: Marmotini
Genus: Marmota
 Alpine marmot, M. marmota 
Genus: Spermophilus
 European ground squirrel, S. citellus 
Family: Gliridae (dormice)
Subfamily: Leithiinae
Genus: Dryomys
 Forest dormouse, D. nitedula LC
Genus: Eliomys
 Garden dormouse, Eliomys quercinus VU
Genus: Muscardinus
 Hazel dormouse, Muscardinus avellanarius LC
Subfamily: Glirinae
Genus: Glis
 European edible dormouse, Glis glis LC
Family: Spalacidae
Subfamily: Spalacinae
Genus: Nannospalax
 Lesser mole rat, Nannospalax leucodon LC
Family: Cricetidae
Subfamily: Arvicolinae
Genus: Arvicola
 European water vole, Arvicola terrestris LC
Genus: Chionomys
 Snow vole, Chionomys nivalis LC
Genus: Clethrionomys
 Bank vole, Clethrionomys glareolus LC
Genus: Dinaromys
 Balkan snow vole, Dinaromys bogdanovi VU
Genus: Microtus
 Common vole, Microtus arvalis LC
 Felten's vole, Microtus felteni DD
 Günther's vole, Microtus guentheri LC
 European pine vole, Microtus subterraneus LC
 Thomas's pine vole, Microtus thomasi LC
Family: Muridae (mice, rats, voles, gerbils, hamsters, etc.)
Subfamily: Murinae
Genus: Apodemus
 Yellow-necked mouse, Apodemus flavicollis LC
 Wood mouse, Apodemus sylvaticus LC
Genus: Micromys
 Eurasian harvest mouse, Micromys minutus LC
Genus: Mus
 Macedonian mouse, Mus macedonicus LC
 Steppe mouse, Mus spicilegus

Order: Lagomorpha (lagomorphs) 

The lagomorphs comprise two families, Leporidae (hares and rabbits), and Ochotonidae (pikas). Though they can resemble rodents, and were classified as a superfamily in that order until the early 20th century, they have since been considered a separate order. They differ from rodents in a number of physical characteristics, such as having four incisors in the upper jaw rather than two.
Family: Leporidae (rabbits, hares)
Genus: Lepus
European hare, L. europaeus

Order: Soricomorpha (shrews, moles, and solenodons) 

The "shrew-forms" are insectivorous mammals. The shrews and solenodons closely resemble mice while the moles are stout-bodied burrowers.
Family: Soricidae (shrews)
Subfamily: Crocidurinae
Genus: Crocidura
 Bicolored shrew, C. leucodon 
Lesser white-toothed shrew, C. suaveolens 
Subfamily: Soricinae
Tribe: Nectogalini
Genus: Neomys
 Southern water shrew, Neomys anomalus
 Eurasian water shrew, Neomys fodiens
Tribe: Soricini
Genus: Sorex
 Alpine shrew, Sorex alpinus
 Common shrew, Sorex araneus

Order: Chiroptera (bats) 

The bats' most distinguishing feature is that their forelimbs are developed as wings, making them the only mammals capable of flight. Bat species account for about 20% of all mammals.
Family: Vespertilionidae
Subfamily: Myotinae
Genus: Myotis
Bechstein's bat, M. bechsteini 
Long-fingered bat, M. capaccinii 
Geoffroy's bat, M. emarginatus 
Subfamily: Vespertilioninae
Genus: Barbastella
Western barbastelle, B. barbastellus 
Genus: Nyctalus
Greater noctule bat, N. lasiopterus 
Lesser noctule, N. leisleri 
Genus: Pipistrellus
 Common pipistrelle, Pipistrellus pipistrellus LC
Subfamily: Miniopterinae
Genus: Miniopterus
Common bent-wing bat, M. schreibersii 
Family: Rhinolophidae
Subfamily: Rhinolophinae
Genus: Rhinolophus
Mediterranean horseshoe bat, R. euryale 
Greater horseshoe bat, R. ferrumequinum 
Lesser horseshoe bat, R. hipposideros 
Mehely's horseshoe bat, R. mehelyi

Order: Carnivora (carnivorans) 

There are over 260 species of carnivorans, the majority of which feed primarily on meat. They have a characteristic skull shape and dentition.
Suborder: Feliformia
Family: Felidae (cats)
Subfamily: Felinae
Genus: Felis
 European wildcat, F. silvestris 
Genus: Lynx
 Eurasian lynx, L. lynx 
Suborder: Caniformia
Family: Canidae (dogs, foxes)
Genus: Canis
Golden jackal, C. aureus 
Gray wolf, C. lupus 
Genus: Vulpes
 Red fox, V. vulpes 
Family: Ursidae (bears)
Genus: Ursus
 Brown bear, U. arctos 
Family: Mustelidae (mustelids)
Genus: Lutra
 European otter, L. lutra 
Genus: Martes
Beech marten, M. foina 
Genus: Meles
European badger, M. meles 
Genus: Mustela
 Stoat, M. erminea 
 Least weasel, M. nivalis 
 European polecat, M. putorius 
Genus: Vormela
 Marbled polecat, V. peregusna

Order: Artiodactyla (even-toed ungulates) 

The even-toed ungulates are ungulates whose weight is borne about equally by the third and fourth toes, rather than mostly or entirely by the third as in perissodactyls. There are about 220 artiodactyl species, including many that are of great economic importance to humans.
Family: Suidae (pigs)
Subfamily: Suinae
Genus: Sus
 Wild boar, S. scrofa 
Family: Cervidae (deer)
Subfamily: Cervinae
Genus: Cervus
 Red deer, C. elaphus 
Genus: Dama
 European fallow deer, D. dama  introduced
Subfamily: Capreolinae
Genus: Capreolus
 Roe deer, C. capreolus 
Subfamily: Caprinae
Genus: Rupicapra
 Chamois, R. rupicapra

See also
List of chordate orders
Lists of mammals by region
List of prehistoric mammals
Mammal classification
List of mammals described in the 2000s

References

External links

North Macedonia
Mammals
Mammals
North Macedonia